Sulistyono Sulistyono (born 27 November 1964) is an Indonesian former professional tennis player.

Sulistyono played in the junior draw at the 1982 Wimbledon Championships and featured in the occasional professional tournament during the 1980s.

Both of Sulistyono's two appearances in Davis Cup ties came in the 1986 competition. Debuting in Indonesia's Eastern Zone round one win over the Philippines, he was beaten in the opening singles rubber by Rod Rafael, but partnered with Donald Wailan to win in the doubles, then won in the reverse singles against Roselle Natividad. In the quarter-finals, against Thailand in Bangkok, Sulistyono featured only in the doubles rubber, which he and Wailan lost to give the home side an unbeatable 3–0 lead.

In addition to the Davis Cup, Sulistyono also represented Indonesia in regional events. At the 1985 Southeast Asian Games, he won three medals, including a gold in the team event. He won a bronze medal at the 1986 Asian Games in Seoul, partnering Donald Wailan in the men's doubles.

See also
List of Indonesia Davis Cup team representatives

References

External links
 
 
 

1964 births
Living people
Indonesian male tennis players
Competitors at the 1985 Southeast Asian Games
Southeast Asian Games medalists in tennis
Southeast Asian Games gold medalists for Indonesia
Southeast Asian Games bronze medalists for Indonesia
Tennis players at the 1986 Asian Games
Medalists at the 1986 Asian Games
Asian Games medalists in tennis
Asian Games bronze medalists for Indonesia
21st-century Indonesian people
20th-century Indonesian people